James Monroe Iglehart (born September 4, 1974) is an American stage actor and singer.

Iglehart is perhaps best known for his Tony Award-winning performance as the Genie in the original Broadway production of Aladdin. Iglehart assumed the role of Marquis de Lafayette/Thomas Jefferson in the Broadway company of Hamilton in April 2017 and can be heard as super producer Steve Jones in As The Curtain Rises, Broadway's first original podcast soap opera.

Early life
Iglehart was born in Hayward, California on September 4, 1974.

Career
Iglehart attended Cal State Hayward and started his career in California, performing in Bat Boy at TheatreWorks in Palo Alto and as Teen Angel in Grease at the American Musical Theatre in San Jose.

In 2005, he directed Bat Boy: The Musical at Ray of Light Theatre. He has played Mitch Mahoney in The 25th Annual Putnam County Spelling Bee on Broadway as a replacement starting in April 2007. He originated the role of Bobby in Memphis on Broadway in October 2009.

Iglehart performed the role of the Genie in Aladdin on Broadway, a performance for which he won the 2014 Tony Award for Best Featured Actor in a Musical and the Drama Desk Award for Outstanding Featured Actor in a Musical for this role. When asked about the role, he said, "It's not as exhausting as you think. I'm kind of an energetic guy in general, so basically I'm kind of being me with the volume turned up." Iglehart departed the company of Aladdin in February 2017 to begin rehearsals in the role of Marquis de Lafayette/Thomas Jefferson in the Broadway company of Hamilton. He also performed in Freestyle Love Supreme on Broadway.

Iglehart guest starred in four episodes of Unbreakable Kimmy Schmidt as Coriolanus Burt, the rival of male protagonist Titus Andromedon.

Iglehart voices Vortex and Asmodeus in Helluva Boss, Lance Strongbow in Tangled: The Series, Captain James Hook in Cheshire Crossing by Andy Weir, Bronzino in Elena of Avalor, Oscar in Vampirina and Taurus Bulba in DuckTales.

In January 2022, Iglehart took over the role of Billy Flynn in Chicago.

Personal life
He was raised in Hayward, California, with his brother. His mother is a former high school choir teacher. His father James Iglehart is a former minor league baseball player and actor.  He met his wife Dawn in the Mt. Eden High School show choir and they married in 2002.

Filmography

Film

Television

Video games

Theatre credits

Awards and nominations

References

External links
 
 
  (archive)

1974 births
Living people
American male musical theatre actors
African-American male actors
20th-century African-American male singers
American male stage actors
American male television actors
American male voice actors
Audiobook narrators
California State University, East Bay alumni
Disney people
Drama Desk Award winners
Male actors from California
People from Hayward, California
Tony Award winners
20th-century American male actors
21st-century American male actors
21st-century American singers
21st-century American male singers
21st-century African-American male singers